The W. G. Hardy Trophy, more commonly referred to as the Hardy Cup, was the Canadian national Intermediate "A" ice hockey championship from 1967 until 1984, and the Canadian national senior championship for Senior "AA" from 1985 until 1990. The Hardy Cup was named for W. G. Hardy, and retired to the Hockey Hall of Fame in 1990.

History
The Canadian Amateur Hockey Association established the W. G. Hardy Trophy in 1968, which became known as the Hardy Cup. It was awarded to the national champion of the intermediate senior division. From 1984 onward, the trophy was awarded to the Senior AA division champions of Canada, after senior and intermediate hockey were merged. The trophy was donated by a group of realtors from North Battleford, and retired from competition in 1990.

Until the 1967-68 season, the Intermediate level had many regional championships. The most prominent was for the Edmonton Journal Trophy, the Western Canadian Intermediate "A" Crown. In Ontario, the Intermediate champions were sometimes included in Allan Cup Senior "A" playoffs. Senior "AA" was unsustainable at the national level and the trophy was retired soon after.

Champions

Championships by location
This is a list of champions by province, territory, or state. From 1968, the Hardy Cup was awarded 23 times.

References
General

Specific

 
Allan Cup
Canadian Amateur Hockey Association trophies
Canadian ice hockey trophies and awards
Ice hockey competitions in Canada
Senior ice hockey